Vinícius Santos Silva (born 3 August 1993), known as Vinícius, is a Brazilian professional footballer who plays as a winger for Goiás.

Honours
Palmeiras
Copa do Brasil: 2012
Campeonato Brasileiro Série B: 2013

Náutico
Campeonato Pernambucano: 2021

References

1993 births
Living people
Brazilian footballers
Brazilian expatriate footballers
Sociedade Esportiva Palmeiras players
Esporte Clube Vitória players
Ceará Sporting Club players
Coritiba Foot Ball Club players
Adanaspor footballers
Associação Chapecoense de Futebol players
Criciúma Esporte Clube players
Clube Náutico Capibaribe players
Esporte Clube Bahia players
Goiás Esporte Clube players
Campeonato Brasileiro Série A players
Campeonato Brasileiro Série B players
Süper Lig players
Expatriate footballers in Turkey
Association football midfielders
Capivariano Futebol Clube players
Footballers from São Paulo